Glenn Van Straatum (born 26 January 1959, in Paramaribo, Suriname) is an association football manager and former Surinamese football midfielder and forward. He was appointed as the manager of the California Victory, a new expansion franchise in the USL Division 1 for 2007. However, the club folded after only one season leaving Van Straatum a free-agent.

Van Straatum has played for SV Transvaal in Surinam (1973-1978) and at the University of San Francisco (1978-1982) and for several semi-professional teams in the San Francisco area including the Greek-Americans FC, Hellas FC, San Francisco Italian Athletic Club and San Francisco Glens in California (1978-1989).  He appeared for Surinam national football team from 1976 to 1978. Van Straatum was hired as head coach at Merritt College in August 2019.

References

Surinamese footballers
Suriname international footballers
Surinamese expatriate footballers
Surinamese football managers
Living people
1959 births
S.V. Transvaal players
SVB Eerste Divisie players
San Francisco Dons men's soccer players
Expatriate soccer players in the United States
Surinamese expatriate sportspeople in the United States
USL First Division coaches
Sportspeople from Paramaribo
Surinamese emigrants to the United States
Association football midfielders